The Beijing Special Weapons and Tactics Unit (Abbr.: SWAT; ; also known as Beijing Special Police Force or simply 'Beijing SWAT' ) is a police tactical unit in the People's Republic of China that deals with incidents beyond the capabilities of normal patrol officers such as hostage situations, high risk warrants and riot control. The unit, along with the Snow Leopard Commando Unit (SLCU), was tasked with many of the security responsibilities of the 2008 Summer Olympics. It is reputed to be one of the most well-equipped and well-trained of all the SWAT/Special Police Units in the PRC. Jurisdictionally the unit is under the control of the Beijing Municipal Public Security Bureau of the Ministry of Public Security (MPS).

History
The Beijing SWAT unit and Snow Leopard Commando Unit (SLCU) were unveiled in a demonstration at the Beijing Police Academy on April 27, 2006, as part of a public relations effort to illustrate the capabilities of the People's Armed Police (PAP) to deal with terrorism issues, protection of delegates, and to enforce law and order in the 2008 Beijing Olympics. The unit has in recent years received training and advice from Western counter-terrorism units.
In June 2008, the unit's 120-operator No. 1 Detachment was renamed Blue Sword or (蓝剑, "Lán jiàn") Commando Unit.

Role
Typically expected of a police tactical unit from any country will be the role of a tactical response team to handle hostage-rescue, high-risk warrants, VIP or dangerous criminal escort duties and sometimes counter-terrorism and anti-riot duties.

Organization
The Beijing SWAT Unit is divided into sub-units consisting of but not limited to: a Helicopter Unit (飞虎队; nicknamed Flying Tigers), an Underwater Diving team (蛙人队; nicknamed Frogmen), female SWAT unit (女子特警队) and a K9 Unit (警犬队).

Training
Recruits are selected from six colleges, including the Beijing Sports University and Chinese People's Public Security University. Beijing SWAT members are trained, aside from combat tactics, in many subjects including English, etiquette, cultural dynamics, intelligence gathering, counter-terrorism and anti-riot and anti-nuclear and biological warfare tactics. All SWAT operatives undergo psychiatric evaluation.

Weapons and equipment
The unit is armed with a variety of domestically manufactured weapons such as QBZ-95 assault rifles and QSZ-92 pistols.

Vehicles

In preparation for the 2008 Summer Olympics, the local government allocated CNY 280 million for the Beijing SWAT to procure equipment for operations, some of which went into purchasing specialized vehicles for various duties including the Hummer H2 and APC's.

See also
Snow Leopard Commando Unit
Special Police Unit

References

2006 establishments in China
Government agencies established in 2006
Special Weapons And Tactics Unit
Specialist law enforcement agencies of China
Non-military counterterrorist organizations